Herod the Great is a 1958 Italian-French epic historical drama film directed by Victor Tourjansky.

Cast 

Edmund Purdom as Herod
Sylvia Lopez as Maryam
Sandra Milo as Sarah 
Elena Zareschi as Alexandra
Alberto Lupo as Aronne
Massimo Girotti as Gaius Octavian
Andrea Giordana as Little Daniele
Corrado Pani as Antipatro, later Herod Antipas
Renato Baldini as Claudio
Camillo Pilotto as The High Priest 
Fedele Gentile as Oreb
Olga Solbelli as Mother of the condemned
Enrico Glori as Taret
Carlo D'Angelo as The man who saw the Messiah's birth 
Enzo Fiermonte
Adolfo Geri 
Nino Marchetti 
Feodor Chaliapin, Jr.

References

External links

1958 films
1950s biographical drama films
1950s historical drama films
Peplum films
Italian biographical drama films
French biographical drama films
Films directed by Victor Tourjansky
Films scored by Carlo Savina
Depictions of Herod the Great on film
Depictions of Augustus on film
Films set in the 1st century BC
Religious epic films
Sword and sandal films
French historical drama films
Italian historical drama films
1950s Italian films
1950s French films